Roman Denisov may refer to:

 Roman Denisov (footballer, born 1986), Russian football player
 Roman Denisov (footballer, born 1999), Russian football player